The Herculoids is an American Saturday-morning animated-cartoon television series, created and designed by Alex Toth, that was produced by Hanna-Barbera Productions. The show debuted on September 9, 1967, on CBS. Hanna-Barbera produced one season for the original airing of the show, although the original 18 episodes were rerun during the 1968–69 television season, with The Herculoids ending its run on September 6, 1969. Eleven new episodes were produced in 1981 as part of the Space Stars show. The plotlines are rooted in science fiction and fantasy.

Plot
On the planet Amzot (renamed Quasar in the revival), the space barbarian family Zandor, Tara and son Dorno fight alongside their giant pets the Herculoids—laser dragon Zok, space rhinoceros Tundro, rock ape Igoo and the shape-shifting Gloop and his son Gleep—to keep their planet safe from invading robots, mad scientists and mutants. The diverse team fought an endless battle against a stream of villains including, according to Children's Television: The First Thirty-Five Years, "the Faceless People, Destroyer Ants, Raider Apes, Mutoids, Arnoids, Zorbots, the Mekkano mechanical men and the Ogs, a strange form of vegetable life."

Characters
There are eight regular characters who make up the Herculoids:

The Herculoids

Humans
The three humans were the only ones who could communicate in English.
 Zandor (voiced by Mike Road) – The protector of Amzot/Quasar, and leader of The Herculoids.
 Tara (voiced by Virginia Gregg) – Zandor's wife.
 Dorno (voiced by Ted Eccles in the original series, Sparky Marcus in 1981) – Son of Zandor and Tara. Despite being their son, he still refers to them by their first names, rather than "Mother" and "Father." However, this changed in the 1980s revival of the series.

Creatures
The five creature characters of The Herculoids are:
 Zok (voiced by Mike Road) – A bat-winged laser dragon. He can emit laser beams from his eyes and tail. His eyes also produce a "nega-beam" that can neutralize certain energy attacks. Zok can survive in space unaided, is capable of interstellar travel, and can also breathe fire.
 Igoo (voiced by Mike Road) – A rock ape. An extremely large and powerful simian, he has extremely dense, rocklike skin and is nearly invulnerable to harm. In one episode, Igoo wades through a pond of molten lava. Igoo has a kind and gentle temperament, except when his loved ones or home are threatened, and displays great fondness of and devotion to Tara in particular.
 Tundro (voiced by Mike Road) – A ten-legged, four-horned rhinoceros/Triceratops hybrid. He can shoot explosive energy rocks from his cannon-horn (Zandor, Tara and Dorno also occasionally shoot similar rocks with slingshots). His natural armor plating is exceptionally strong, similar to Igoo's rock skin. His legs have the ability to extend to a remarkable length, somewhat like stilts. He can also spin his head at blinding speed, allowing him to drill through solid rock, and has the ability to make magnificent leaps.
 Gloop and Gleep (both voiced by Don Messick) – Two protoplasmic creatures. They are able to absorb and deflect energy blasts and laser beams, often placing themselves between attackers and other Herculoids to act as shields. They also possess the ability to shape-shift which they have used in numerous ways, including: transforming into cushions, trampolines, or parachutes to break falls; stretching themselves between tree limbs or rocks to act as slingshots; and binding an attacker's limbs to restrain them, or, alternatively, encircling their entire body to squeeze and render them unconscious. They can also each momentarily divide their body mass into separate portions under their full control when necessary until they quickly reunite. Gloop is the larger of the two and Gleep is the smaller.

Legacy
After its initial run, The Herculoids was featured in several anthology wheel series produced by Hanna-Barbera including Hanna–Barbera's World of Super Adventure, Space Stars (for which 11 additional episodes were created), Power Zone on Cartoon Network, and both the Cartoon Network and Boomerang incarnations of Super Adventures. The series has also influenced other artists of various mediums. 

Award-winning video game designer David Crane has stated that he enjoyed the series as a child and that the character of Blobert from the A Boy and His Blob franchise was directly inspired by Gloop and Gleep. Jamaican-American DJ DJ Kool Herc at one time employed a backing band which also drew its name from the show, fictionalized versions of which appear in the Netflix period series The Get Down.

Cameos
Roughly contemporaneous to their own series premiere, the Herculoids made a crossover appearance in an episode of Space Ghost, "The Molten Monsters of Moltar" (sources are unclear and/or inconsistent as to exact airdates). In the "Council of Doom" story arc, Space Ghost, while battling the combined might of all of his enemies, meets a number of Hanna-Barbera heroes just as they were debuting in their own respective series. Along with the Herculoids were Shazzan, Moby Dick and the Mighty Mightor, the last two sharing one series. 

Several episodes of Space Ghost Coast to Coast mention or show the Herculoids. In "Lawsuit", Space Ghost mentions the Herculoids' planet. In the episode "Sequel", he goes to their planet and refers to it as a "rotten hippie monster commune" after they demand he leave while pelting him with stones. 

Gloop is featured prominently and is mentioned by name in the Sealab 2021 episode "Hail, Squishface". 

Gloop makes several guest appearances on Harvey Birdman: Attorney at Law as well. Gleep is mentioned at one point. He make cameo appearances in the episodes "Mindless" and "Juror in Court". Zok makes an appearance in "Peanut Puberty" (Phil Ken Sebben throws a graph chart at him). In the episode "Beyond the Valley of the Dinosaurs", Tundro fires his energy rocks at Phil Ken Sebben, who forgot to close the hot-tub time portal to prehistoric times. In "Evolutionary War", Tara appears on the evolution chart—in between Fred Flintstone and Race Bannon. 

The Herculoids is mentioned in an episode of The Venture Bros., where an old "fan letter" of Dr. Venture to the show is discovered. Upon reading, the letter is revealed to be more akin to hate mail; young Rusty Venture called the Herculoids hippies for not fighting in Vietnam. 

Tundro and Gloop appear in "8 Simple Rules for Buying My Teenage Daughter", a fourth-season episode of Family Guy. In the scene, Gloop fails to get a babysitting job from Lois. In protest, Tundro shows up and fires his energy rocks at Lois. Gloop and Gleep appeared in a cameo as captured prisoners of a hostile alien race in the Dexter's Laboratory episode "Mis-Placed in Space". 

Igoo, Gloop and Gleep make cameo appearances in Space Jam: A New Legacy. They are among the Warner Bros. 3000 Server-Verse inhabitants that watch the basketball game between the Tune Squad and the Goon Squad.

Igoo appeared in the HBO Max series Jellystone! episode "Jelly Wrestle Rumble" as a wrestler. Zandor and Gleep appeared in the season 2 episode "Bleep". Gleep is portrayed as a female in a TV show where she is seen being hugged by Zandor. As for Gloop, he appears in "Heroes and Capes" as an enormous creature from the sewers. 

The Herculoids appear in issue #50 of the comic book New Mutants when Professor X is searching for Magik on a planet in the Shi'ar galaxy.

List of episodes

Original series
Each show featured two Herculoids episodes.

Space Stars revival

Voices
 Ted Eccles (originally), Sparky Marcus (in 1981) as Dorno
 Virginia Gregg as Tara
 Don Messick as Gleep, Gloop
 Mike Road as Zandor, Zok, Igoo, Tundro
 Vic Perrin as Mekkor and the Captain of the Sky Pirates
 Paul Frees as Sarko

The Herculoids in other languages
 
  The show was introduced by ATV in Hong Kong as "宇宙泰山" in traditional Chinese or Cantonese, which stands for Tarzan in Space or Universe.
 
 
 
  Kaijû Ô Tâgan (Monster King Targan)
The characters' names in Japan were Targan (Zandor), Marmi (Tara), Kane (Dorno), Maryû (Zok), Rikira (Igoo), Tangurô (Tundro), Hyûhyû (Gloop) and Bôbô (Gleep).
 . The cartoon was dubbed into Welsh and transmitted during Yr Awr Fawr (The Big Hour) on Sunday mornings. Originally shown on BBC2 Wales and then BBC1 Wales in the late 1970s and 1980s, this was before the introduction of the Welsh-language channel S4C in 1982.

Home media
On June 14, 2011, Warner Archive released The Herculoids: The Complete Series on DVD in region 1 as part of their Hanna-Barbera Classics Collection. This is a Manufacture-on-Demand (MOD) release, available exclusively through Warner's online store and Amazon.com.

On July 27, 2021, the complete series was released on Blu-ray. The Blu-ray includes the opening narration and the second-season alternate titles that were not released on the Complete Series DVD.

In other media

Comic books

The Herculoids have appeared in various comic books through the years. They appear in issues #1–2 and 4–7 of the Gold Key Comics series Hanna-Barbera Super TV Heroes (1968–69). They appear in issue #3 of the Marvel Comics series TV Stars (1978). Between 1997 and 1999, they appear in issues #5, 9, 13 and 17 of the DC Comics series Cartoon Network Presents.

In 2016, the Herculoids play a major role in the DC Comics series Future Quest. This series features characters from various Hanna-Barbera animated series such as Jonny Quest, Space Ghost, Birdman and the Galaxy Trio, Frankenstein Jr. and The Impossibles, and Moby Dick and Mighty Mightor. They also featured in issues #9–11 of the spin-off title, Future Quest Presents, in a story written by Rob Williams and illustrated by Aaron Lopresti.

See also
 Space Stars
 List of works produced by Hanna-Barbera Productions
 List of Hanna-Barbera characters

References

External links
 
 The Herculoids at the Big Cartoon DataBase
 Interview with Futrue Quest Presents artist, Aaron Lopresti, A Podcast Named Scooby-Doo!, October 2019

1960s American animated television series
1980s American animated television series
1967 American television series debuts
1969 American television series endings
1981 American television series debuts
1982 American television series endings
American children's animated action television series
American children's animated science fantasy television series
American children's animated space adventure television series
American children's animated superhero television series
Animated television series about extraterrestrial life
Animated television series about families
CBS original programming
Characters created by Alex Toth
DC Comics superheroes
English-language television shows
Extraterrestrial superheroes
Hanna-Barbera superheroes
Television series by Hanna-Barbera
Television series set on fictional planets
Animated television series about dragons